Eva Hauserová (* November 25, 1954, Prague) is Czech journalist, sci-fi and non-fiction writer and feminist.

Biography
Hauserová is a graduated biologist on Charles University in Prague. She worked for Czech Academy of Sciences and later as an assistant editor in several publishing houses.

She has been a key figure in the Prague science fiction scene since the early 1980s.

Bibliography (examples)
  Hostina mutagenů, Svoboda 1992
  Cvokyně, Ivo Železný 1992
  Zrání Madly v sedmi krocích, ROD Brno 2000
  Blues zmražené kočky, Šťastný 2005
  Na koštěti se dá i lítat, LN, Praha 1995
 Jsi přece ženská, Grada, Praha 1998

References

External links
 Eva Hauserová official page 
 Eva Hauserová blog 
 Eva Hauserova and the world of Czech feminist writing, Czech Radio, 13-07-2003  

1954 births
Living people
Czech women writers
Czech non-fiction writers
Czech journalists
Czech feminists
Czech women journalists
Charles University alumni